SS Conister (I) No. 145470 – the first vessel in the Company's history to bear the name – was a coastal cargo vessel which was purchased by the Isle of Man Steam Packet Company from Cheviot Coasters Ltd, in 1932.

Construction & dimensions
Conister was built by the Goole Shipbuilding Company, Goole, in 1921, and originally named Abington. Her engines were supplied by C. and D. Holmes Ltd of Hull. Her construction costs are not recorded.
Her machinery was aft, and she had two masts forward of the funnel.

Service life
Originally named Abington, she entered service with Cheviot Coasters Ltd. in November 1921, operating from Newcastle-upon-Tyne. She was bought by the Isle of Man Steam Packet Company in January 1932 for £5,500, (equivalent to £ in ) when her name was changed to Conister.

Conister was engaged in general cargo work and was frequently to be seen in Ramsey, unloading goods from Liverpool, before sailing on to Douglas.

Conister was the last coal-fired ship in the Company's fleet and the last using reciprocating triple-expansion engines. During the Second World War, Conister was kept busy maintaining the lifeline to the Island.
On 27 October 1940 Conister was severely damaged by a bomb during an air attack.

Disposal
With the impending introduction into service of her successor , Conister was put up for sale. On 26 January 1965 she was sold to Arnott Young & Co., Glasgow, and was taken under tow to Dalmuir by the tug Campaigner for scrapping.

Conister was the last single-hatch steamer, regularly working in the Irish Sea.

Gallery

References

Bibliography

 Chappell, Connery (1980). Island Lifeline T.Stephenson & Sons Ltd 

Ships of the Isle of Man Steam Packet Company
1921 ships
Steamships of the United Kingdom
Ferries of the Isle of Man
Ships built in Goole
Merchant ships of the United Kingdom
Maritime incidents in October 1940